Newporte is a meteorite crater in North Dakota, United States.

It is 3.2 km in diameter and the age is estimated to be less than 500 million years (Cambrian or younger). The crater is not exposed at the surface.

References

External links
Aerial Exploration of the Newporte Structure

Cambrian impact craters
Impact craters of the United States
Landforms of North Dakota
Landforms of Renville County, North Dakota